The Battle of Kietlanka was a battle of the January Uprising, fought on 13 May 1863, between the insurrect forces against the forces of the Russian Empire. It was fought near the village of Kietlanka, Poland.

Background 
On 25 April 1863, following the victorious battle of Stok during the January Uprising, the detachment of the Polish insurgents commanded by lieutenant colonel Ignacy Mystkowski connected with the another group of rebels, and begun marching alongside the railway tracks. The joined formation counted 1200 people, however despite that, it lacked enough firearms and ammunition. As such, they have decided to attack the train transporting three grenadier companies of around 360 soldiers, and weapons, heading to the Małkinia Górna.

Before the battle, the insurgents commanded by lieutenant colonel Ignacy Mystkowski had attacked and defeated the Russian squad of soldiers, that was guarding the Małkinia railway station. Later, on the morning of 13 May 1863, near the village of Kietlanka, Poland, the insurgents had laid a trap on the military train removed the steel rails from the railway tracks, replacing them with wooden replicas, planning to derail the upcoming train. Then, several companies of the insurgents placed themselves on one side of track, awaiting the train. However, a few hours hours before the attack, the local flagman, who had previously noticed the insurgent forces passing through that area, had alerted the Russian offices of the possible ambush. As such, the train driver, expecting the possibility of an ambush, begun slowing down the train earlier than scheduled. Due to that, when train reached the trap, only the first few cars derailed.

The battle 

Following the derailment of the train, the insurgents laid heavy fire on the Russian forces inside, commanded by the major general Nikolay Toll. Due to miscalculations made earlier insurgents, that led them to occupy positions only on the one side of the track, the Russian soldiers left the train, and took position behind it, on the opposite side of the track, and begun firing from the gaps between train wheels. In the early stage of the battle, all main leaders of the insurgent forces were killed, which included: Ignacy Mystkowski, Leopold Pluciński, Józef Podbielski, and Władysław Ostaszewski. The fight lasted for the several hours, with neither side being able to gain the upper hand.

Eventually, the Russian reinforcements, previously stationed near Czyżew, had arrived, tipping the scale of the battle of the Russian side. It included a few rifle companies and a squadron of Cossack host, consisting of around 50 Cossack soldiers. The rebels were pushed back, taking a defensive position, and eventually retreating into the forest. They had also received reinforcements, which allowed them to temporarily withhold Russian attacks. However, eventually, the Cossack squadron managed to bypass the rebel defenses, hitting them from the back, and surrounding them. As such, the insurgents begun to scatter in different directions across the forest, retreating from the fight. By the evening, the remnants of the rebel detachment managed to break through the swamps, retreating from the fight. Russian troops were ordered not to pursue them.

The battle ended with Russian victory. In the fight were killed 40 Polish insurgents, 25 were wounded, and about 80 were captured. Additionally, an unknown number of them had fled or drowned during the retreat to the swamps. According to the Polish data, around 60 Russian troops were either killed or wounded.

Notes

References 

Kietlanka
Kietlanka
1863 in Poland
May 1863 events
Derailments in Poland